Viaggio Italiano is Andrea Bocelli's third studio album and first classical album.

The album features some of the most popular opera arias and Neapolitan songs of all time, such as Nessun Dorma, O Sole Mio and la Donna è Mobile. Although released only in Italy in 1996, it sold close to 300,000 copies. Bocelli later received the ECHO Klassik "Best seller of the year" award for the album, after its international release, in 1997.

Track listing

"Nessun dorma"
"Lamento di Federico"
"Ah, la paterna mano"
"la Donna è Mobile"
"Una furtiva lagrima"
"Panis angelicus"
"Ave Maria"
"O Sole Mio"
"Core 'ngrato"
"Santa Lucia Luntana"
"I te vurria vasa"
"Tu, ca nun Chiagne"
"Marenariello"
"Piscatore 'e pusilleco"
"Messaggio Bocelli"
"Adeste fideles"

Charts

Weekly charts

Year-end charts

Certifications

References 

1995 albums
Andrea Bocelli albums